Sator is a 2019 American supernatural horror film written and directed by Jordan Graham and starring Michael Daniel, Rachel Johnson, Aurora Lowe, Gabriel Nicholson and June Peterson.

1091 Pictures announced that the film would be released digitally and on video on demand on February 9, 2021 (platforms included Amazon, iTunes/AppleTV, Google Play and Microsoft).

Plot 
Nani, who suffers from dementia, believes a supernatural entity called Sator speaks to her in her mind and compels her to make automatic writings. Her daughter mysteriously vanishes. Nani’s grandson Adam withdraws to a remote cabin to search for Sator, by exploring the surrounding woods with his dog and a hunting rifle, and by reviewing footage from a deercam installed near the cabin. Adam's sister Deborah tries to manage the family, Adam’s brother Pete has a mental breakdown while with a friend named Evie, who loses her memory of the brothers following an accident.

Wearing fur and an animal skull mask, a disciple of Sator comes to Adam’s cabin. She passes him a photograph, depicting several Sator disciples standing in a dark forest. Meanwhile, Adam’s dog goes missing in the woods. While helping his brother look for the dog, Pete tells Adam that he thinks their grandfather Jim sacrificed himself to Sator, endorsed by Nani.

Adam finds Evie tied to a tree. He frees her, but feels suddenly compelled to choke her. Evie runs away and disappears into the sky.

Several Sator disciples visit Adam’s cabin. He flees to a nearby cave and is drawn inside, where he becomes possessed encountering Sator.

Pete revisits Adam at the cabin. He sees Evie sitting silently in a chair. Adam stabs Pete in his throat and burns his face in the fireplace. Possessed now, Adam levitates.

Back at her house, Nani laughs when she sees Adam, whose head is now bald, standing in the hallway. Nani disappears and Deborah searches for her outside. Adam chokes Deborah, and Evie pours gasoline on Deborah as she and Adam burn her to death. Sator disciples gather around the fire.

Adam reenters the house, where he walks past a room where a bald woman sits silently with Adam’s dog. Adam joins Nani in a different room where she sits with another Sator disciple.

Cast
 Michael Daniel as Pete
 Rachel Johnson as Evie
 Aurora Lowe as Deborah
 Gabriel Nicholson as Adam
 June Peterson as Nani

Production
Principal photography took place in Santa Cruz, California and the Yosemite National Park. The film was in post-production for almost six years due to the solo work and budget limits of director Jordan Graham, who also built the cabin that was used in the film. June Peterson, who plays Nani in the film, is Graham's grandmother, and her belief in a supernatural being called Sator which watches over her formed the basis of the film's story.

Reception
The website's critics' consensus reads: "Supernatural horror of a refreshingly subtle vintage, Sator uses one family's fight against demonic possession to cast its own dark, stubborn spell." The film has an aggregated score of 82 out of 100 on Metacritic based on 8 reviews, indicating “universal acclaim”.

Leslie Felperin, writing for The Guardian, gave the film a score of 4 stars out of 5. In her review, she noted the film's similarities to other low-budget horror films such as The Blair Witch Project and The Witch, and wrote: "Mixing black and white, low-resolution footage with more colourful material creates a bricolage-like effect that keeps wrong-footing the viewer. Graham uses darkness and a very sparse score/soundscape to create a truly disturbing work that relies not so much on gore as the uncanny in its most potent form: stillness, pools of darkness and just-visible figures." Aya Stanley of The A.V. Club gave the film a grade of B+, writing: "Through both theme and texture, Graham approximates the slow phobia of Ari Aster's Hereditary—the pervasive feeling that the dominos are tumbling and there is nothing that can be done about it."

Writing for Variety, Dennis Harvey said: "this cryptic occult drama may be more impressive in its striking atmospherics than in its somewhat murky storytelling", adding: "This is the classic instance of a horror film that will please discerning viewers largely for what it doesn’t do, while more mainstream genre fans will chafe at the relative lack of gore, action and explication, complaining that "nothing happens."" He concluded: "You may not come out of Graham’s film with much definite sense of just what Sator is or wants (though the eventuality of some dead people has made it clear what it can do), but you emerge with the uncommon feeling of having dreamed someone else’s somber, unsettling dream."

References

External links
 
 

2019 films
American supernatural horror films
American independent films
Folk horror films
1091 Pictures films
2010s English-language films
2010s American films